The Battle of Monastir took place near the town of Bitola, Macedonia (then known as Monastir) during the First Balkan War, between Serbian and Ottoman forces from 16 to 19 November 1912. It resulted in a Serbian victory after heavy fighting north of the city, the routed Turks fled abandoning their guns.

Battle
As an ongoing part of the Balkan Wars, the Ottoman Vardar Army retreated from the defeat at Kumanovo and regrouped around Bitola. The Serbs seized Skopje then sent forces to help their Bulgarian ally besiege Adrianople.
The Serbian 1st Army, advancing south on Monastir (modern Bitola), encountered heavy Ottoman artillery fire and had to wait for its own artillery to arrive. 
According to French Captain G. Bellenger, writing in Notes on the Employment of Artillery in the Balkan Campaign, unlike the Ottomans, Serbian field  artillery  was  very  mobile, at some point the Serbian Morava Division dragged four long-range artillery pieces up a mountain, then each night hauled the guns closer to the Turkish forces to better support the infantry.

On 18 November, following the destruction of the Ottoman artillery by Serbian artillery, the Serbian right flank pushed through the Vardar Army. The Serbs then entered Bitola on 19 November. With the conquest of Bitola the Serbs controlled southwestern Macedonia, including the symbolically important town of Ohrid.

Aftermath

After the battle of Monastir, the five-century-long Ottoman rule of Macedonia was over. The Serbian 1st Army continued fighting in the First Balkan War. At this point some officers wanted the 1st Army to continue its advance down the valley of the Vardar to Thessaloniki. Vojvoda Putnik refused. The threat of war with Austria-Hungary loomed over the issue of a Serbian presence on the Adriatic. In addition, with the Bulgarians and Greeks already in Thessaloniki, the appearance of Serbian forces there would only muddle an already complicated situation.

References

Sources

 
 
 
 
 
  

Battles of the First Balkan War
Conflicts in 1912
1912 in the Ottoman Empire
Battles involving the Ottoman Empire
Battles involving Serbia
Military history of North Macedonia
1912 in Europe
Manastir vilayet
History of Bitola
Bitola Municipality
Vardar Macedonia (1912–1918)
Battles of the Ottoman–Serbian Wars
November 1912 events